The Banquo Legacy is a BBC Books original novel written by Andy Lane and Justin Richards and based on the long-running British science fiction television series Doctor Who. It features the Eighth Doctor, Fitz and Compassion.

Trivia
The novel began life as a non-Doctor Who story by Lane and Richards that was never published. Some while later, Richards then converted the story to fit the Eighth Doctor Adventures.

External links
The Cloister Library - The Banquo Legacy

2000 British novels
2000 science fiction novels
Eighth Doctor Adventures
Novels by Andy Lane
Novels by Justin Richards